Giant octopus is a common name for the genus Enteroctopus.

Giant octopus may also refer to:

 Gigantic octopus, a cryptid
 St. Augustine Monster, a globster mistakenly believed to be a gigantic octopus
 Lusca, suggested to be a gigantic octopus
 Mega Shark Versus Giant Octopus, a low budget monster movie produced by The Asylum

See also
 Haliphron atlanticus, thought to be the largest octopus species
 Kraken, Norse sea monster
 Cthulhu, Lovecraftian horror monster
 Giant squid (disambiguation)